Maria Apollonio (13 June 1919 – 1990) was an Italian sprinter.

Biography
She won bronze medal in the 4×100 metres relay, first medal of ever for the Italian women in a relay race, at the 1938 European Athletics Championships in Vienna, with Maria Alfero, Rosetta Cattaneo and Italia Lucchini She has 3 caps in national team from 1937 to 1938.

Achievements

See also
 Italy national relay team

References

External links
 

1919 births
1990 deaths
Date of death missing
Italian female sprinters
European Athletics Championships medalists
20th-century Italian women